Khoshaba  (also written Khawshaba,) is a village located in the Tel Kaif District of the Ninawa Governorate in Iraq. The village is located ca.  southeast of Alqosh and ca.  northeast of Telskuf in the Nineveh Plains. It belongs to the disputed territories of Northern Iraq.

Khoshaba is populated by Yazidis.

Etymology
Khoshaba comes from the Assyrian-Aramaic word ܚܕܒܫܒܐ khoshaba meaning Sunday.

See also
 Yazidis in Iraq

References

Populated places in Nineveh Governorate
Yazidi populated places in Iraq